Ruth Ogbeifo (born 18 April 1972) is a Nigerian weightlifter.

At the 1999 World Championships in the 75 kg category she won bronze medals in snatch, clean and jerk, and overall.

She competed in the 75 kg weight class at the 2000 Summer Olympics and won the silver medal, with 245.0 kg in total.

Notes and references

External links
profile

1972 births
Living people
Nigerian female weightlifters
Olympic weightlifters of Nigeria
Weightlifters at the 2000 Summer Olympics
Olympic silver medalists for Nigeria
Olympic medalists in weightlifting
Medalists at the 2000 Summer Olympics
World Weightlifting Championships medalists
20th-century Nigerian women
21st-century Nigerian women